A lobster roll is a dish native to New England. It is made of lobster meat served on a grilled hot dog-style bun. The filling may also contain butter, lemon juice, salt, and black pepper, with variants made in some parts of New England replacing the butter with mayonnaise. Other versions may contain diced celery or scallion. Potato chips or French fries are the typical side dishes.

History
According to the "Encyclopedia of American Food and Drink" the lobster roll originated as a hot dish at a restaurant named Perry's in Milford, Connecticut, as early as 1929.  Its popularity then spread up and down the Connecticut coast, but not far beyond it.  In Connecticut, the sandwich served warm is called a "lobster roll"; served cold, a "lobster salad roll."

As far back as 1970, chopped lobster meat heated in drawn butter was served on a hot dog bun at roadside stands such as Red's Eats in Maine. Lobster rolls in the U.S. are associated with the state of Maine, but are also commonly available at seafood restaurants in the other New England states and on Eastern Long Island, where lobster fishing is common.

Lobster rolls in Maine are characteristically served on a New England-style hot dog bun, which is split on the top instead of the side and has flat sides for grilling. The lobster meat is usually served cold, rather than warm or hot, and mayonnaise is typically spread inside the bun or tossed with the meat. The filling consists of chunked knuckle, claw, and lobster tail and is only lightly seasoned if at all.  Four ounces is a standard serving size.

Lobster rolls are a popular seasonal meal, particularly among tourists throughout the Maritime provinces in Canada, especially Nova Scotia, where they may also appear on hamburger buns, baguettes, or other types of bread rolls and even in pita pockets. The traditional side orders are potato chips and dill pickles.

McDonald's restaurants in Canadian provinces, such as Nova Scotia and Ontario, as well as in New England, offer lobster rolls as a seasonal item in the summer.

See also 

 Cuisine of New England
 List of regional dishes of the United States
 List of sandwiches
 List of seafood dishes

References

External links

American sandwiches
Seafood sandwiches
Lobster dishes
New England cuisine
Cuisine of Atlantic Canada